Princess seams are long rounded seams sewn into women's blouses or shirts to add shaping or a tailored fit to closely follow a woman's shape.  They are sewn into the front and/or back of a shirt, and extend from the waist up to the arms. Princess seams are distinct from darts in that they form a continuous line and are a full seam. Darts, on the other hand, are folds sewn into the clothing to shape the resultant garment.

The princess seam style of dress needs no waistline at all, since it does its shaping without darts, by joining edges of different curvature. The resulting "princess seams" typically runs from the shoulder (or under the arm) curving gently over the bust point and down to the lower hem. This creates a long, slimming look, often seen in dresses with an "A-line" silhouette.

See also

 Clothing terminology
Princess line

Notes

References

Bibliography
 http://www.dressking.com/search/glossary.htm
 https://web.archive.org/web/20111029070415/http://style.polo.com/glossary/default.asp?letter=P
 http://www.sewing.org/files/guidelines/11_310_princess_seams.pdf
 https://www.muellerundsohn.com/en/allgemein/princess-seam/

Parts of clothing
Seams